María Luján Argüelles Álvarez (Salas, Asturias, Spain; January 26, 1977) is a Spanish radio broadcaster and television presenter.

Biography 
She began her professional career at the age of 19, while studying history and playing the piano. After working for Radio Vetusta, she decided to move to Madrid and signed up for Onda Cero. She did both radio and TV work from 2001 to 2002. She started her career on May 3, 2001, on Canal 7 in Madrid, where she hosted the show E-Misión Glamourosa until June 29, 2001.

In 2002, she signed with Antena 3, where she worked as a reporter in several programs, a moment in which her name began to be known to viewers and that led her to combine it with the presentation of the summer magazine La orilla on TeleAsturias and Asturias in RTPA.

In 2008, she began a new stage in Cuatro. A year later, she signed a 4-year contract with the same channel. During this period, she was in charge of Password and Lo que diga la rubia, among other programs.

In 2010, the merger between Sogecuatro and Gestevisión Telecinco, took place, thus creating the Mediaset España group, with which the presenter renewed her long-term contract with Cuatro in 2014.

During this stage, she was in charge of several contests, but what really catapulted her to fame was her role as a matchmaker in several dating shows. In April 2018, after almost a year without new projects in the group, it was announced that she would not renew her contract with Mediaset España after 10 years in Cuatro and 8 years in the group. She worked with the group and did a radio show for Agencia EFE at the same time.

Although she did not renew her contract with Mediaset Españaas a presenter, she remained linked to the media group as a collaborator, first in El programa de Ana Rosa on Telecinco and later in Cuatro al día in the afternoons on Cuatro.

Simultaneously, she signs with Telemadrid and presents La báscula from September 2018 to 2020, and since 2019, she has collaborated in Está pasando, which she also presents when its presenter is absent. During this stage, she continues to lead the radio program of Agencia EFE.

In December 2020, she will present the contest Divididos in La Sexta, despite her commitments with Telemadrid and EFE radio.

Private life 
On July 13, 2015, Luján gives birth to her first daughter with businessman Carlos Sánchez Arenas, whom she named Miranda.

Trajectory

Radio

Television

Published books 

 Cenicienta llevaba tacones de 15 cm. Martínez Roca. 2014. Pages: 288. ISBN 9788427041042

Awards 

 Antena de Oro Award 2009 for best presenter for Password and Granjero busca esposa.
 Zapping Awards 2011 for best presenter for Dame una pista and Granjero busca esposa.

References 

Spanish game show hosts
Spanish television presenters
Spanish women television presenters
Spanish radio presenters
Spanish women radio presenters
Spanish journalists
Spanish women journalists
Living people
1977 births